The Butler's Dilemma is a 1943 black-and-white British comedy film, directed by Leslie S. Hiscott and starring Richard Hearne in a dual role as Rodney Playfair and a Butler called Chapman, Ronald Shiner as Ernie, Ian Fleming, Francis L. Sullivan, Judy Kelly and Hermione Gingold. It was produced by Elisabeth Hiscott, Graham Cutts for Shaftesbury Films, and filmed at British National Studios.

Plot
A group of friends undertakes a number of deceptions in order to stage an illicit gambling party. Wimpish Rodney Playfair (Hearne) is persuaded, by a promise to erase his gambling debts, to impersonate an old manservant named Chapman (also played by Hearne) for a few weeks in order to unwittingly provide an alibi for an accomplished thief. Hearne's dual role alternates between him playing the timid young Playfair, (in effect Hearne playing his real age) and the doddery butler 'Chapman', who is 'Mr Pastry' in all but name.

Cast
 Richard Hearne as Rodney Playfair
 Francis L. Sullivan as Leo Carrington
 Judy Kelly as Ann
 Hermione Gingold as Aunt Sophie
 Henry Kendall as Carmichael
 André Randall as Vitello
 Ian Fleming as Sir Hubert Playfair
 Ralph Truman as Bishop
 Wally Patch as Tom
 Ronald Shiner as Ernie
 Marjorie Rhodes as Mrs Plumb
 Arthur Denton as Detective
 Alf Goddard as Policeman

Critical reception
TV Guide gave the film two out of five stars, calling it, "Terribly tepid."

References

External links
 
 
 

1943 films
1943 comedy films
British black-and-white films
1940s English-language films
Films directed by Leslie S. Hiscott
British comedy films
Films shot at British National Studios
1940s British films